The 1924 Kansas State Wildcats football team represented Kansas State Agricultural College in the 1924 college football season.

Schedule

References

Kansas State
Kansas State Wildcats football seasons
Kansas State Wildcats football